Baramura also known as Hatai Kotor is a hill range in Tripura, India. Baramura also known for its great Hornbill. The 8 National Highway(Assam-Agartala road) cross through the Baramura hill range. Baramura has a gas thermal and power plant.

Park
Baramura Eco-Park, is an Eco-Park 40 Kilometer far away from Agartala the capital of Tripura.

References 

Mountains of Tripura